Kencargo Airlines International was a cargo airline based in Kenya. It ceased operations in 2004,.

History 
The airline ceased operations in April 2004 when Kenya Airways acquired all the shares held by the other Joint Venture partners,  formed Kenya Airways Cargo and transferred Kencargo's business to the new entity.

Ownership
As at incorporation, the company's shareholding was as follows:
.

See also
 Kenya Airways
 KLM
 Martinair

References

Defunct cargo airlines
Defunct airlines of Kenya
Airlines established in 2001
Airlines disestablished in 2004
Cargo airlines of Kenya